Abd al-Hakim Hajj Yahya (born 16 February 1965) is an Israeli Arab engineer and politician. He was a member of the Knesset for the United Arab List.

Biography
Hajj Yayha was born in Tayibe, and studied civil engineering at the Technion – Israel Institute of Technology. He is married with four children and lives in Tayibe.

Hajj Yayha  joined the Islamic Movement in 1981. He served as mayor of Tayibe for six months in 1998 and again from 2005 until 2007. In 2007 Interior Minister Roni Bar-On removed Hajj Yayha from office and replaced him with an appointed committee. Hajj Yayha filed a petition against the decision, but it was dismissed.

Prior to the 2015 Knesset elections he was elected to second place on the United Arab List (UAL), the political wing of the Southern Branch of the Islamic Movement. With the party becoming part of the Joint List, an alliance with Hadash, Balad and Ta'al, Hajj Yahya was placed sixth on the overall Joint List list. He was elected to the Knesset as the alliance won 13 seats. For the April 2019 elections, the UAL ran a joint list with Balad, with Hajj Yahya as the second UAL candidate and third on the joint list. He was re-elected to the Knesset as the alliance won four seats.

References

External links

1965 births
Living people
Technion – Israel Institute of Technology alumni
Israeli engineers
Mayors of places in Israel
People from Tayibe
Arab members of the Knesset
Islamic Movement in Israel politicians
United Arab List politicians
Members of the 20th Knesset (2015–2019)
Members of the 21st Knesset (2019)
Israeli Muslims